Mehmood Kot , or Mehmood Kot is a city in District Muzaffargarh, Punjab, Pakistan. Mehmood Kot was established by Mehmood Gujjar, who was the ruler of Dera Ghazi Khan in the 17th century and he built a fort here which he named after himself.

The Lal Pir Power is in Mehmood Kot and produces 362 MW of electricity. The city is served by Mahmud Kot railway station.

References

Muzaffargarh
Muzaffargarh District
Populated places in Muzaffargarh District